Daughters of Mary Help of Christians Siu Ming Catholic Secondary School (天主教母佑會蕭明中學), founded in 1973, is a girls' secondary school in Kwai Chung, Hong Kong. It is administered under the Grant Code and using English as a medium of instruction, or being an "EMI school".

Religion 
Catholicism

Brief history
Daughters of Mary Help of Christians Siu Ming Catholic Secondary School is a subsidized  girls' grammar school run by the Daughters of Mary Help of Christians. Founded in 1973, the school has incorporated the educational philosophy of St. Mary Mazzarello and St. John Bosco, that is educating young people with love and putting equal stress on the importance of virtue, wisdom, physique, sociability, aesthetic appreciation and spirituality in providing quality education to the community.

School Motto

Purity and Charity ( Integrity and Honesty; Love and Concern )

Mission statement
To foster clear goal-setting, life-long learning and community participation in a caring, Christian educational environment.

School Target

1. To enhance learning and teaching effectiveness through reading across the curriculum and strengthening learning strategies.

2. To strengthen students’ leadership and self-confidence.

Teachers

The total number of teaching staff members is 61 with 66% of them holding master's degrees as their highest education level, 33% holding bachelor's degrees as their highest education level and 100% holding professional qualifications.

Medium of Instruction

English is adopted as the medium of instruction.

Chinese Language, Chinese History, Putonghua, Chinese Literature, Liberal Studies, Ethics & Religious Education, Civic Education, Life & Society, Visual Arts are conducted in Chinese.

Class Organization
There are 24 classes:
4 classes each from S.1 to S.6
There are 16 elective modules of 13 different subjects offered to the 4 classes in each level of S.4 to S.6.

School Organization and Management
The School Management Committee, headed by the School Supervisor and consisting of 7 members in all, is responsible for the School's financial management, personnel management and the delivery of education to students.
The School Administration Committee, headed by the School Principal and including Vice-Principal, 3 appointed and 2 elected teacher representatives, leads and directs the School in all important school affairs.
The functional teacher groups are categorized into 5 sections, namely Student Training, Student Activities, Academic Development, General Management/Support Services and IT Assisted Education. Groups in the same section are coordinated by the Vice-Principal and senior teachers.
The teaching staff consists of 60 members, including the Principal, Vice-Principal, senior teachers, teachers and a native-speaking English teacher.

Extra-curricular Activities
Club Activities and Extracurricular Classes  Students are divided into 4 houses, Green House, Blue House, Yellow House and Red House. : The School has more than 40 clubs and types of extracurricular activities.They are divided into 6 categories, namely Academic Learning, Physique, Skills, Art, Services and Religious Belief.The activities include Science Club, Home Economics Club, Visual Arts Club, Drama Group, Long Distance Running Group, Junior Red Cross, Student Social Service Group, School Choir (Senior Choir & Junior Choir), Chinese Orchestra, String Orchestra, Melodica Band and more than 10 musical instrumental classes.To promote knowledge and appreciation of performing arts among students, the School also participates in the School Arts Animateur Scheme organized by the Leisure and Cultural Services Department.

Special Training  Lively and challenging training camps such as the Orientation Wild Training Camp, the Guangzhou Huangpu Military School Training Camp and the Adventure-based Guidance Training Camp are available to students for the purpose of enhancing their self-esteem and promoting cooperation among them.

Self-governed Groups  The presence of the Student Association, the Disciplinary Prefect Association and the Four Houses helps strengthen the communication between the School and students and enhance students' skills in leadership and organization. Students may form cabinets and stand for election, thereby enriching their experience in democracy and accountability.

Exchange and Services  Students have the opportunities to visit the Mainland for cultural exchange and providing various services for poor children.

School Awards and Scholarships

Outstanding Performance in Subject Awards
Improvement Awards
Conduct Awards
Service Awards
Leadership Awards
St. Mary Mazzarello's Award ( The Most Outstanding Student of the Year )
Retired Principal's Scholarship
Siu Wai Hing Fund
Siu Wai Hing Scholarships
Siu Wai Hing Grants
Siu Wai Hing Activity Sponsorship Scheme
Siu Wai Hing Supplementary Grant
Personal Development Award Scheme
Parent-Teacher Association Scholarship
Extensive Reading Program
Past Pupils' Association - Laura Vicuna Scholarship
Outstanding Student Award
Service for Learning Award Scheme

Moral and Academic Development
School Assemblies and Form Assemblies are conducted each week. S.1 students have additional short assemblies. This is the time when teachers or guest speakers share with students their reflection on the wisdom of life, either in person or through broadcast.
There are Ethics/Religious Education lessons at all levels that focus on the search for true values through daily life experience.
A series of training like leadership training camps, military training camps and wild camps post challenges to both mind and body of students.
The "Service Learning Scheme" aims to encourage students to take part in in-school or community service projects. It helps to build up among students a strong will and a spirit to serve others.

The "Self-Actualization Scheme" encourages S.1 students to make continual self-assessment and to set targets and goals for their studies as well as other areas.
In S.1, Social Studies lessons are conducted in all classes to help students grasp knowledge while the use of Putonghua as the medium of instruction in the Chinese lessons is piloted in one of the classes.
S.2 students also have Civic Education lessons that help to enhance their civic awareness. The drama component has been integrated into the English Language Curriculum with the aim of enhancing students' competence in expressing themselves in English. They are required to attend the cheering team training sessions to prepare for the Annual Sports Day.
S.3-S.7 students have several sessions on Careers Education which aim at providing direction for early pursuit of both career and life orientation.
For the purpose of upgrading language skills, there is daily reading time in class. Students are offered additional courses of English Pronunciation during non-school hours. They also have the opportunities for public speaking in and outside classrooms.
The Cross-curricular Project-Based Learning Scheme in junior levels has been implemented since 1998. It aims to develop students' abilities on self-learning and inter-personal communication. It also trains students' data collection skills and analytical minds.
Computer Literacy lessons in junior levels focus on the application of common computer software and the training in logical thinking. All students can have access to the Computer Room during their free time in school. This facilitates their early and quick mastery of information technology.

School song

External links
 Daughter of Mary Help of Christians Siu Ming Catholic Secondary
 Daughters of Mary Help of Christians Siu Ming Catholic Secondary School Library
 Daughter of Mary Help of Christians Siu Ming Catholic Secondary Past Pupil Association
 Daughter of Mary Help of Christians Siu Ming Catholic Secondary Student Association

See also
 Education in Hong Kong
 List of schools in Hong Kong

References

Secondary schools in Hong Kong
Kwai Chung
Salesian secondary schools
Catholic secondary schools in Hong Kong
Educational institutions established in 1973
Girls' schools in Hong Kong
1973 establishments in Hong Kong